David Stern (born 21 May 1963 in New York City) is an American conductor, director and founder of the ensemble Opera Fuoco. He has been the Chief Conductor of Palm Beach Opera since 2015.

Life and career 

David Stern's musical leadership is spread across three continents. Whether conducting a major symphony orchestra, baroque opera, teaching vocal master classes or defending cultural activities, Stern keeps his musicians, students and audiences riveted by sharing his strong musical convictions, his flexibility of approach and his belief that music is relevant and indeed essential in today's world. He is the founder and director of the Paris-based opera studio and period-instrument ensemble Opera Fuoco, as well as artistic adviser and chief conductor of the Shanghai Baroque Festival and chief conductor of the Palm Beach Opera. In 2018, he was named the Program Director of the Heifetz International Music Institute's inaugural Baroque Vocal Workshop.

Stern is known for his extensive range of repertoire. As music director of the Israel and the St. Gallen Opera houses, he championed eclectic works such as Simone Mayr's Medea, Alban Berg's Wozzeck, Benjamin Britten's Turn of the Screw and Kurt Weill's Mahagonny. He has premiered four new operas since 2010: Gil Shohat's A Child Dreams at the Israeli Opera, Nicolas Bacri's Cosi Fanciulli commissioned by Opera Fuoco and performed at the Théâtre des Champs-Elysées in Paris, Ben Moores Enemies, A Love Story in Palm Beach and Jan Sandström's The Rococo Machine in Drottningholm, Sweden. 
 
Since launching the Aix-en-Provence Festival's Academie Internationale d’Art Lyrique with Stéphane Lissner in 1998, David Stern has been committed to developing young voices. He created Opera Fuoco in 2003 as a platform for young professional singers in France, combining both an opera studio, a period-instrument ensemble and a company which produces concertante and staged projects both nationally and internationally. He works regularly with the Young Artists Program in Palm Beach.

With Opera Fuoco, he has recently recorded ”Berenice che fai?”, a compilation of late Baroque and early Classical works with three members of Opera Fuoco Young Artist program singers. It has been very well received by the press. Previous recordings with Opera Fuoco include The Romantic Cantatas with Karine Deshayes, Johann Christian Bach's opera Zanaida, and two Handel oratorios, Semele and Jephtha. He also recorded Simone Mayr's Medea with the St. Gallen Opera. In 2020, he recorded with NDR Philharmonie Hannover and the soprano Ania Vegry a Gassmann opera arias program for CPO.

Stern has enjoyed collaborations with international stage directors including David Alden, Stéphane Braunschweig, Robin Guarino, Sam Helfrich, Waut Koeken, Jakob Peters-Messer and Aron Stiehl, among many others. With Yoshi Oïda he created iconic settings of Britten's Curlew River and Mahler's Das Lied von der Erde and with Francisco Negrin he led performances of Mozart's Mitridate as artist in residence at the 2014 Drottningholm Opera Festival. The productions of Telemann's Damon at the Magdeburg Theater in 2016 as well as Telemann's Richardus in 2018 received great critical acclaim. 
 
David Stern is frequent guest conductor around the globe. He is regularly invited to the Edmonton Opera, the Drottninghom Opera Festival, the Hong Kong Philharmonic, the Shanghai and Guangzhou Symphonies, the China Philharmonic, the New Russian Symphony, the Swedish Chamber orchestra and has led recent performances with the Boston Lyric Opera, the Royal Danish Opera orchestra, the Vienna Symphony and NDR Hannover.

In 2019/2020 he was invited as guest conductor with Shanghai symphony, Guangzhou symphony and Sydney symphony. In June he will conduct Marseille Philharmonic Orchestra and in July he will conduct Boston Symphony in the Tanglewood Festival.

Stern received his Bachelor of Arts from Yale College and his Masters of Music from the Juilliard School.

References

External links 

Opera Fuoco website
 https://www.agenceartistiquecedelle.com/davidstern

American male conductors (music)
1963 births
Living people
21st-century American conductors (music)
21st-century American male musicians
20th-century American conductors (music)
20th-century American male musicians
Yale University alumni
Juilliard School alumni
Musicians from New York City
Classical musicians from New York (state)